Jolly Abraham, also known as Jollee Abraham, is an Indian gospel singer and film singer in Malayalam cinema. He sang more than 100 Malayalam movie songs during the 1970s and 1980s. He was born in Kumbalam, Eranakulam, and is a graduate in BSc Botany from Sacred Heart College Thevara, Cochin. He has also sung a few Tamil, Telugu and Kannada movie songs. Married with two children, he lives in  Chennai.

Partial filmography

As an actor
 Aakramanam (1981)
 Kilinjalgal (1981) (Tamil movie)
 Aattuvanchi Ulanjappol (1984)

As a singer

 Kaattinkaravaal ... 'Kunjikkaikal (1974)
 Ushassinte Radhathil ... Kunjikkaikal (1974)
 Pandoru Mukkuvan ... Kunjikkaikal (1974)
 Jayikkaanaay Janichavan ... Chattambikkalyaani (1975)
 Bhagavadgeethayum Sathyageetham ... Omanakkunju (1975)
 Rajanigandhi ... Panchami (1976)
 Maanam Potti Veenu ... Paarijaatham (1976)
 Govinda naama Sankeerthanam ... Thuruppugulan
 Sahyaachalathile ... Penpuli (1977)
 Maamalayile Poomaram ... Aparaadhi (1977)
 Kaapaalikare ... Rathimanmadhan (1977)
 Eenam Paadithalarnnallo ... Sneham (1977)
 Enikkippol Paadanam ... Madhuraswapnam (1977)
 Pidichaal Pulinkombil ... Madhuraswapnam (1977)
 Ankavaalillatha ... Pattalaam Jaanaki (1977)
 Ambalappuzha Paalppaayasam ... Parivarthanam (1977)
 Swapna Bhoovil Vellikkudakkeezhe ... "Daaliya Pookkal" (1980)
Singing Christian songs from 1995
Oru Chinna manikkuyilu from the Tamil movie ... Katta Panchayathu (1996)
Nadigai Paarkum Naatagam from the Tamil movie ... Oru Nadigai Natakam Parkiral (1978)
Onnonnanam Kunnathu from the Malayalam Movie ... Chanchattam (1991)
Manjhinte from the Malayalam movie ... Nirvrithi (2003)
Varika nee vasanthame from the Malayalam movie ... Pambaram (1979)
Annushasukal from the Malayalam movie ... Aadipaapam (1989)
Doore Neelavaanam from the Malayalam movie ... Oormakale Vida Tharu (1980)
Indulekha Maranju from the Malayalam movie ... Avivahitharude Swargam (1979)
Annushasukal from the Malayalam movie ...  Aadipaapam (1979)
Nazhikakal Than from the Malayalam movie ... Seetha
Varika nee vasanthame from the Malayalam movie ... Pambaram
Shantha Rathri Thiru rathri from the Malayalam movie ... Thuramukham (1979)
Viswamohini from the Malayalam movie ... Madhurikkunna Raathri (1978)
Anthikkadappurathoru from the Malayalam movie ... Chamayam
Dheemtha Thakka from the Malayalam movie ... Guruvayur Kesavan
AMBALAPPUZHA PAALPPAAYASAM from the Malayalam movie ... Parivarthanam (1977)
Maanishaada from the Malayalam movie ... Arangum Aniyarayum (1980)
Yaa Habbi from the Malayalam movie ... Manithali (1984)
Innathe Pulariyil from the Malayalam movie ... Agni Vyooham (1979)
Kwaja Sheikhin Maqbaraa from the Malayalam movie ... Maniyara (1983)
Allah Allah from the Malayalam movie ... Indradhanussu (1979)
Innuma polladha vetkam from the Tamil movie ... Thiruppangal (1981)
Mangai Endral Vanam Kooda Irangum from the Tamil movie ... Iraivan Kodutha Varam (1978)
Vala kilukkam Kelkkanallo from the Malayalam movie ... Sphodanam (1981)
Ponnurukki Poomalayil from the Malayalam movie ... Penn Simham (1986)
Aakaasha Swapnamo from the Malayalam movie ... Penn Simham (1986)
Bhagavadhgeethayum from the Malayalam ... Omanakkunju (1975)
Aalinganathin from the Malayalam movie ... Iniyathra (1979)
Kaliyugamoru from the Malayalam movie ... Sathrusamhaaram (1978)
Makarasankramaraathriyil from the Malayalam movie ... Kaumarapraayam (1979)
Kaaveri Nadikkarayil Valarnna Kanyakayo from the Malayalam movie ... Kaumarapraayam (1979)
Makarasankramaraathriyil from the Malayalam movie ... Kaumarapraayam (1979)
Aalolalochanakal from the Malayalam movie ... Vellayani Paramu (1979)
Reena Meena - Manmathan Ratchikanum from Tamil Movie ... Oru Thalai Ragam (1980)Enne Njan marannu from the Malayalam movie ... Naayattu (1980)Gomedakam from the Malayalam movie ... Himam (1983)Vilambuvaan Thulumbumee from the Malayalam movie ... Himam (1983)Ezhu Swarangal from the Malayalam movie ... Samudram (1977)Sahyaachalathile from the Malayalam movie ... Penpuli (1977)Malai Raani Mundhaanai from the Tamil movie ...Ore Vaanam Ore Bhoomi (1979)Gangai karaiyil from the Tamil movie ... Geetha Oru Shenbagapoo (1980)Oduvathu Azhagu Ratham Theduvathu Puthiya Mugam from the Tamil movie ... Deiveega Raagangal (1980)Thangaali Bees from the Kannada movie ...onde raktha (1984)Odum Thira Onnam Thira from the Malayalam movie ...Aakkramanam (1981)Manmadan from the Tamil movie ... Oru Thalai Ragam (1980)Adiyenai paaramma pidivaatham yenamma vanakkathirkuria kaathaliye' from Tamil movie Vanakkathirkuria Kaathaliye''

References

External links

 Website Jolly Abraham

Living people
Malayalam playback singers
Tamil playback singers
Indian gospel singers
Indian male playback singers
Film musicians from Kerala
Singers from Kochi
20th-century Indian male actors
Male actors in Tamil cinema
Male actors in Malayalam cinema
Indian male film actors
20th-century Indian male singers
20th-century Indian singers
Year of birth missing (living people)